Noel Ebriega Rosal (born January 2, 1964) is a Filipino businessman and politician served as the governor of Albay in 2022. He previously served as mayor of Legazpi from 2001 to 2010, and again from 2013 to 2022.

Personal life
Rosal is a graduate of Bachelor of Science in Industrial Engineering from Adamson University. He later took up Master's Degree in Business Administration and Bachelor of Laws at Aquinas University.

Rosal is married to Carmen Geraldine Barrameda, mayor of Legazpi City (2010–2013, 2022–present). They have three children: Princess, Gerald Noel, and Gilian Noelle.

Political career

Before 2001
An industrial engineer, Rosal started his career in 1989 when he defeated the incumbent yet the longest-serving chieftain of Barangay Gogon in 20 years. He became a city councilor in 1990 and served for two terms.

As city mayor
In 2001, he was elected mayor of Legazpi City and served until 2010; and again in 2013, this time unopposed. He served as city administrator while his wife, Geraldine, was the mayor from 2010 to 2013.

Rosal received various awards and recognitions from known award-giving bodies for good governance, including those from the United Nations Educational, Scientific and Cultural Organization and the United States Agency for International Development. The city received recognitions as well.

During his tenure, Rosal enforced in the city an order from the Department of Environment and Natural Resources to the concerned local government units surrounding Mayon Volcano stopping all quarry operations following a landslide in Guinobatan during Super Typhoon Goni (Rolly) in 2020.

Rosal has been referred to as the "Jesse Robredo of Albay".

2004 election protest against Rosal
Rosal's mayoralty opponent in the 2004 elections, former councilor Michael Victor Imperial, filed before the Commission on Elections a pre-proclamation protest against him contesting the results in several polling precincts, citing various irregularities.

In January 2006, following the recount, the COMELEC Second Division in its resolution proclaimed Imperial the duly elected city mayor and ordered Rosal to leave the mayor's office. The resolution was affirmed by the commission en banc in May 2006.

Rosal later brought the issue to the Supreme Court which issued the status quo ante order in June 2006 and, in March 2007, nullified all decisions by the COMELEC, allowing him to continue performing as mayor while the true results of the 2004 mayoral elections are being determined.

As provincial governor
In 2022, Rosal, ran under the political party Katipunan ng Nagkakaisang Pilipino, defeated incumbent Albay Governor Al Francis Bichara, garnering almost twice number of votes than the latter; thus the first governor from the province's second district after three decades.

Disqualification case
On September 19, 2022, the COMELEC First Division granted the petition filed on April by Joseph Armogila, a defeated city council candidate, who asked for the disqualification of Rosal from the 2022 local elections for violating an election code provision on ban on public spending in his capacity as city mayor. On the same day, Rosal said in his statement that he would appeal the said ruling, citing that it is not yet final and executory.

The COMELEC en banc, in its unanimous resolution dated November 18, denied the motion for reconsideration filed by Rosal, upholding the disqualification, stating that they found no convincing reason for its reversal. On November 25, a certificate of finality was issued as there were no any order from the Supreme Court (SC) came within five days to halt the said decision. Rosal only filed a petition for temporary restraining order at the SC on the same day. Despite Rosal awaiting the decision, on November 29, the COMELEC, issuing a writ of execution, ordered him to relinquish and vacate his post as provincial governor; it became effective upon its enforcement two days later.

References

1964 births
Bicolano politicians
Living people
People from Legazpi, Albay
Mayors of places in Albay